Outwood railway station is situated in the Outwood district of Wakefield in West Yorkshire, England.

Outwood is the first stop on the Wakefield Line  after Leeds for trains going towards Wakefield Westgate, Doncaster and Sheffield.

History
The original station was opened by the Bradford, Wakefield and Leeds Railway in 1858, and was originally named Lofthouse. This was renamed Lofthouse and Outwood in July 1865. It closed on 13 June 1960. A different Lofthouse and Outwood station, which was on a different route, opened in 1876 and closed in 1958.

The station was reopened on 12 July 1988.

Facilities

The station is unstaffed and has two wooden platforms with waiting shelters, customer help points, digital display screens, timetable posters and automated train announcements provide running information. Level access to both platforms is via ramps.

Services
Monday to Saturdays two trains per hour head northbound to Leeds and southbound one train per hour goes to Doncaster and one to Sheffield, both operate via . In addition, the Sheffield service also goes via .

Sundays there is generally an hourly service to Leeds and a two-hourly service to Doncaster and Sheffield respectively.

References

External links

Railway stations in Wakefield
DfT Category F1 stations
Former Great Northern Railway stations
Railway stations in Great Britain opened in 1858
Railway stations in Great Britain closed in 1960
Railway stations in Great Britain opened in 1988
Reopened railway stations in Great Britain
Northern franchise railway stations